Steven Law  also known as Htun Myint Naing and Lo Ping Zhong is a Burmese businessman. He is best known for being the managing director of Asia World, the country's largest conglomerate, and as son of Lo Hsing Han, one of the country's most notable drug traffickers. Law also owns the Magway FC.

Family
Law has six brothers: Lu Law, David Lo, Eric Ping Sin Lo, Henry Lo, Moses Ping Chao Lo, and Aung Kyaw Naing, and two sisters: Daisy Lo and Thida Han Ma. He wed a Singaporean national, Cecilia Ng (Ng Sor Hong), who has two children from a previous marriage, on 16 March 1996.

References

Burmese businesspeople
Burmese people of Chinese descent
Living people
Year of birth missing (living people)